Ciprian Cătălin Petre (born 10 December 1980) is a Romanian football player who plays as winger for CSM Focșani. In his career Petre played for teams such as Juventus București, Unirea Urziceni, Gloria Bistrița or Gaz Metan Mediaş or FC Buzău among others.

Personal 
He is often wrongly mistaken as being the older brother of Ovidiu Petre. The two are not related.

Honours
Juventus București
Liga III: 2002–03

Gaz Metan Mediaș
Liga II: 2015–16

SCM Gloria Buzău
Liga III: 2018–19

References

External links
 
 

1980 births
Living people
People from Buzău County
Romanian footballers
Association football midfielders
Liga I players
Liga II players
Liga III players
ASC Daco-Getica București players
CSM Jiul Petroșani players
FC Unirea Urziceni players
ACF Gloria Bistrița players
CS Gaz Metan Mediaș players
FC Gloria Buzău players
CSM Focșani players